Rix, often called Rix-Trébief, is a commune in the  Jura department in the region of Bourgogne-Franche-Comté in eastern France.

Geography
Rix-Trébief is located 11 kilometres east of Champagnole.

It is composed of the villages of Rix and Trébief, as well as the farm of Le Barbillon.

Population

See also
Communes of the Jura department

References

Communes of Jura (department)